Ahmad Bishti (born 8 August 1927) was the Libyan Minister of Foreign Affairs from 1965–1968. He became an ambassador of Libya to Turkey after he left office in 1968. He graduated as surgeon from University of Cairo in 1959.

Biography 
He graduated as a surgeon at Cairo University in 1959 and practiced medicine between 1960 and 1963. 

He was appointed Minister of Health at the end of the government of Mohamed Osman El Seid and the governments of Mohiuddin Fikini and Mahmud Al-Montaser (March 1963-March 1965), then Minister of Foreign Affairs of the Governments of Hussein Maazak, Abdul Qader Al-Badri and Abdel-Hamid Al-Bakoush (October 1965). 

He became ambassador to Turkey from January 1968 and was ambassador during the 1969 coup in Libya.

Notes

External links
 History.state.gov

1927 births
Living people
Libyan politicians
Ambassadors of Libya to Turkey
Foreign ministers of Libya
Health ministers of Libya
Cairo University alumni
Libyan expatriates in Egypt
Libyan physicians
20th-century Libyan politicians